Daniel Emile Codling (born 19 July 1979 in Auckland, New Zealand) is a former boxer who won a bronze medal in the 64–69 kg (welterweight) division at the 2002 Commonwealth Games.

References

1979 births
Living people
Commonwealth Games bronze medallists for New Zealand
Welterweight boxers
Boxers at the 2002 Commonwealth Games
Boxers from Auckland
New Zealand male boxers
Commonwealth Games medallists in boxing
Medallists at the 2002 Commonwealth Games